Terengulsky District  is an administrative and municipal district (raion), one of the twenty-one in Ulyanovsk Oblast, Russia. It is located in the center of the oblast. The area of the district is  Its administrative center is the urban locality (a work settlement) of Terenga. Population: 18,761 (2010 Census);  The population of Terenga accounts for 28.4% of the district's total population.

References

Notes

Sources

Districts of Ulyanovsk Oblast